Epic Ink is an American reality television series that premiered on August 20, 2014 on A&E Network. The series features a group of talented tattoo artists and their love of tattooing pop culture at their Oregon-based shop, Area 51 Tattoo. Episodes aired on Wednesdays at 10:30 p.m. EST.

Premise
The series follows Area-51 Tattoo owner Chris 51 and his "out-of-this-world" team of tattoo artists as they bring pop-culture (movies, comics, cartoons, sci-fi and fantasy) to life as living body art in eye-popping ink. Their specialties are hyperrealistic tattoos that are what they like to call, "geek-chic".

Opening introduction by narrator:

Tattoo artists
 Chris 51 - Shop owner, one of the most well-respected tattoo artists, specializing in pop culture and alien art tattoos. Chris imagined and co-created the show, casting all his friends for the roles.
 Heather Maranda - Self-taught tattoo artist, specializing in cartoony/bright-color hyper-realistic tattoos
 Jeff Wortham - Comic book art, sci-fi and cartoon tattoos, travels the globe to tattoo at sci-fi conventions
 Chris Jones - Hailing from Wales, nominated for three consecutive Tattoo Industry Awards for Best UK Male, specializes in hyper-realistic and portrait tattoos 
 Josh Bodwell - A "walking encyclopedia" of sci-fi trivia, specializes in sci-fi/futuristic, realism and portraiture tattoos. 
 Caroline Russell - Shop manager/receptionist, not a "geek" on pop culture like the others and serves as the "nerd translator" between the "geeks" and "normal" people

Episodes

See also
 List of tattoo TV shows

References

External links
  of Epic Ink
 
 
 
 Area 51 Tattoo (Epic Ink) official website

A&E (TV network) original programming
Television series set in tattoo shops
2010s American reality television series
2010s American documentary television series
2014 American television series debuts
2014 American television series endings
Television shows set in Oregon
Television shows filmed in Oregon
Television series by Matador Content